Invisible Fence Inc. (commonly referred to as Invisible Fence) is a company that designs pet fences for cats and dogs. Manufactured and distributed by Radio System Corporation, the company sells wireless and fenceless systems that were first introduced in 1973. Its best known product consists of an underground wire and a collar with an integrated transmitter that provides a signal to the pet when it approaches the perimeter.

History
In the 1970s, traveling salesman Richard Peck worked as a sales and product manager for companies in Pennsylvania. His work took him from city to city and as he drove through these towns, he noticed the number of dead pets lying along highways and city streets. He developed the idea of an "Invisible Fence". In 1973, he received a patent for the concept to build the first invisible fence concept. Peck formed a company called Stay-Put Sales Co. and marketed his product mainly through direct mail and magazines. In 1976, Peck sold the marketing and patent rights to John Purtell. Purtell created a company named Invisible Fence Co.

In the 1980s, the receiver the dog wore around its neck was around the size of a cigarette packet. It suited larger dogs like Labradors and huskies but not smaller animals like chihuahuas without choking them. The product's range also only allowed a maximum of three acres of circle wire. Putrell pulled it from the market while the product was redeveloped to be smaller and need a new battery only twice a year.

Invisible Fence Co. lost exclusive rights to Peck's invention when the patent expired in 1990. As a result, many other companies emerged and designed their own version of the product including Radio system Corp, who currently owns the company.
In 1993, John Purtell sold his interest in Invisible Fence.

In 2001, IFCO and the Invisible Fence Brand were sold to Kohlberg & Company. Kohlberg and Company sold the company to Radio Systems Corp in 2006.

Project Breathe
Its Project Breathe initiative created donates provides animal oxygen mask kits to fire departments and first responders.

Notable products

References

Animal training
Buildings and structures used to confine animals
Companies based in Tennessee
Fences
Franchises
Pet equipment
American companies established in 1973
1973 establishments in Tennessee